Delaware Avenue Historic District is a national historic district located at Wilmington, New Castle County, Delaware. It encompasses 180 contributing buildings and 1 contributing structure developed in the late-19th and early-20th centuries.  The district is primarily residential and includes a variety of Victorian-era mansions and large dwellings in a variety of popular architectural styles including Italianate, Queen Anne, Colonial Revival, Classical Revival, and American Four Square The houses are detached or semi-detached and are primarily three stories in height with extensive wings to the rear. The district also includes 20th century apartment complexes.  Also located in the district is the St. Stephen's Lutheran Church and the Sailors and Soldiers Monument.  The separately listed Howard Pyle Studios are also located in the district.

It was added to the National Register of Historic Places in 1976, with a boundary increase in 1987.

Education
Residents are zoned to the Red Clay Consolidated School District, both in the original section and the expansion. Zoned schools include William C. Lewis Dual Language Elementary School (K-5), Skyline Middle School (6-8), and Alexis I. du Pont High School.

References

External links

Italianate architecture in Delaware
Queen Anne architecture in Delaware
Colonial Revival architecture in Delaware
Neoclassical architecture in Delaware
Historic districts in Wilmington, Delaware
Historic American Buildings Survey in Delaware
Historic districts on the National Register of Historic Places in Delaware
National Register of Historic Places in Wilmington, Delaware